Schoenotenes peos is a species of moth of the family Tortricidae first described by Józef Razowski in 2013. It is found on Seram Island in Indonesia.

The wingspan is about 18 mm. The ground colour of the forewings is white, strigulated (finely streaked) with brownish grey. The hindwings are white.

Etymology
The specific name refers to close relation with Schoenotenes collarigera and is derived from Greek peos (meaning brother-in-law).

References

Moths described in 2013
Schoenotenini